Metaleptus batesi is a species of beetle in the family Cerambycidae. It was described by George Henry Horn in 1885.

References

Trachyderini
Beetles described in 1885